Danny Law (born 15 July 1975) is a former English cricketer. Born in Lambeth, Law played for Sussex, Essex and Durham between 1993 and 2003.

During his debut List A performance for Sussex in June 1995, he managed to finish not out at number six by the close of innings in a 10-run victory. As he fell down the Sussex pecking order, he found himself out of the side in 1997, and instead playing for Essex.

During his ten-year career, he scored fifteen half-centuries and two centuries, at a 20.35 average. He conceded exactly 7000 first-class bowling runs in all first-class matches, finishing eight times with a five-wicket haul.

Later career 
Danny Law now plays for Westmeadows cricket club where he coached from 2014-2016. He later was part of a dual premiership era at Westmeadows in a team captained by his great mate Tarek ‘Viv’ Moughanie.

External links
Danny Law at Cricinfo

1975 births
Living people
English cricketers
Durham cricketers
Essex cricketers
Sussex cricketers
People from Lambeth
NBC Denis Compton Award recipients
Cambridgeshire cricketers
Test and County Cricket Board XI cricketers